Hurricane is a rural locality in the Shire of Mareeba, Queensland, Australia. In the  Hurricane had a population of 17 people.

Geography
Hurricane is located west of Mount Carbine and the Mulligan Highway, and is on the Mitchell River, which flows through the eastern section and then forms the south-western boundary. The Hodgkinson River, a tributary of the Mitchell, also flows through the eastern section. The St George River, also a tributary of the Mitchell, flows through the northern section and forms part of the north-western boundary. Much of the land in Hurricane consists of shaly or greywacke ridges.

The land use is grazing on native vegetation.

History 
In the  Hurricane had a population of 17 people.

Economy 
There are a number of homesteads in the locality, including cattle stations:

 Hurricane Station
 Karma Waters

Attractions
Karma Waters station provides a bush camping experience for a limited number of guests.

References 

Shire of Mareeba
Localities in Queensland